East Riverdale is an unincorporated area and census-designated place (CDP) in Prince George's County, Maryland, United States. The population was 18,459 at the 2020 census.

Geography
East Riverdale is located at  (38.956315, −76.913615).

Demographics

2020 census

Note: the US Census treats Hispanic/Latino as an ethnic category. This table excludes Latinos from the racial categories and assigns them to a separate category. Hispanics/Latinos can be of any race.

2000 Census
As of the census of 2000, there were 14,961 people, 4,538 households, and 3,353 families residing in the CDP. The racial makeup of the CDP was 28.71% White, 49.98% African American, 0.59% Native American, 3.71% Asian, 0.14% Pacific Islander, 13.18% from other races, and 3.68% from two or more races. Hispanic or Latino of any race were 26.47% of the population.

There were 4,538 households, out of which 42.4% had children under the age of 18 living with them, 43.9% were married couples living together, 21.4% had a female householder with no husband present, and 26.1% were non-families. 19.9% of all households were made up of individuals, and 4.5% had someone living alone who was 65 years of age or older. The average household size was 3.29 and the average family size was 3.74.

In the CDP, the population was spread out, with 31.1% under the age of 18, 12.0% from 18 to 24, 33.5% from 25 to 44, 17.8% from 45 to 64, and 5.7% who were 65 years of age or older. The median age was 29 years. For every 100 females, there were 102.9 males. For every 100 females age 18 and over, there were 101.6 males.

The median income for a household in the CDP was $45,547, and the median income for a family was $48,918. Males had a median income of $31,807 versus $30,520 for females. The per capita income for the CDP was $15,758. About 11.1% of families and 13.7% of the population were below the poverty line, including 16.0% of those under age 18 and 8.9% of those age 65 or over.

Education
East Riverdale is within the Prince George's County Public Schools system. Schools serving the CDP include:

Elementary schools:
 Berwyn Heights Elementary School
 Bladensburg Elementary School
 Port Towns Elementary School
 Riverdale Elementary School
 Templeton Elementary School

Middle schools:
 William Wirt Middle School
 Charles Carroll Middle School

High schools:
 Bladensburg High School
 Parkdale High School

References

Census-designated places in Prince George's County, Maryland
Census-designated places in Maryland